Synoicum pulmonaria, the tennis ball ascidian or sea-fig, is a species of colonial sea squirt, a tunicate in the family Polyclinidae. It occurs in shallow water in the northeastern Atlantic Ocean, the North Sea and the English Channel, and also, to a lesser extent, in the northwestern Atlantic Ocean.

Description
Synoicum pulmonaria is the largest colonial tunicate in the northeastern Atlantic. Young colonies are pear-shaped or club-shaped and are attached by a short stalk. The individual zooids are not easy to distinguish, but form groups of seven or eight around a common atrial syphon. The common tunic is tough and cartilaginous, yellowish-brown and transparent. It is usually encrusted with sand and shell fragments.

Distribution
Synoicum pulmonaria is a coldwater species of sea squirt and is found in the northeastern Atlantic Ocean as far north as Svalbard and as far south as the English Channel and the coast of Normandy. In the 21st century it seems to be becoming more abundant in Normandy on the lower foreshore, taking a tear-like form and somewhat resembling Polyclinum aurantium.

References

Aplousobranchia
Animals described in 1786